Peter Kelly (17 August 1944 – 2 January 2019) was an Irish Fianna Fáil politician. He was a Teachta Dála (TD) from 2002 to 2011.

Biography
Previously a funeral director and publican, Kelly was first elected to Dáil Éireann for the Longford–Roscommon constituency at the 2002 general election. He was re-elected at the 2007 general election for the new Longford–Westmeath constituency. He was a member of Longford County Council from 1985 to 2003, and also previously served on Longford Town Council.

He lost his seat at the 2011 general election. He died from cancer on 2 January 2019.

References

 

1944 births
2019 deaths
Deaths from cancer in the Republic of Ireland
Fianna Fáil TDs
Irish funeral directors
Local councillors in County Longford
Members of the 29th Dáil
Members of the 30th Dáil
Politicians from County Longford